The following is a list of recurring esports tournaments in alphabetical order, split between active and defunct tournaments.

Active

Defunct

Notes

References